Balmoral Mills  (Muillean Bhaile Mhoireil) is a community in the Canadian province of Nova Scotia, located in  Colchester County. It is home to the Balmoral Grist Mill Museum as well as its own provincial park.

References
 Balmoral Mills on Destination Nova Scotia

Communities in Colchester County